The second season of the CBS sitcom Everybody Loves Raymond aired from September 22, 1997 to May 18, 1998.

Season overview  

In the premiere season, Everybody Loves Raymond was critically acclaimed and considered to be a quality series by CBS executives. While most of its episodes suffered from low ratings due to being scheduled Friday night, the average ratings doubled when it was moved to Monday in March 1997. CBS renewed Raymond for a second season a month later on April 11, 1997. The second season of Everybody Loves Raymond was produced by HBO Independent Productions, creator Philip Rosenthal's company Where's Lunch, and David Letterman's Worldwide Pants. While the season continues the episodic format and comedy style established in the first season, there are a few minor differences. These includes its increased presence of supporting actors such as Kevin James, Andy Kindler, and Monica Horan; and the filming location switching from Hollywood Center Studios to Warner Bros. Studios, also the location of all later seasons. The intro for the second season depicts Romano sitting on a lawn chair while family members fly around him, except Robert.

Cast

Main 
Ray Romano as Raymond "Ray" Barone
Patricia Heaton as Debra (née Whelan) Barone
Brad Garrett as Robert Barone
Doris Roberts as Marie Barone
Peter Boyle as Francis "Frank" Barone
 Madylin Sweeten as Alexandra "Ally" Barone
Sawyer Sweeten as Geoffrey Barone 
 Sullivan Sweeten as Michael Barone

Supporting 
 Monica Horan as Amy McDougall
 Andy Kindler as Andy
 Kevin James as Kevin Daniels
 Jon Manfrellotti as Gianni 
 Shamsky II
 Tom McGowan as Bernie Gruenfelder
 Maggie Wheeler as Linda Gruenfelder 
 Katherine Helmond as Lois Whelan 

 Robert Culp as Warren Whelan
 Sherri Shepherd as Judy
 Charles Durning as Father Hubley
 Joseph V. Perry as Nemo
 Tina Arning as Angelina
 Fred Stoller as Gerard
 Phil Leeds as Uncle Mel
 Dave Attell as Dave
 Dan Castellaneta as Bryan Trenberth

Reception

Reviews 
Entertainment Weekly named Raymond the second best series of 1997, claiming "No sitcom enjoyed a better batting average: Every episode has been a home run." In May 1998, Neal Justin of the Star Tribune called Everybody Loves Raymond the "best sitcom" of the 1997–98 season, reasoning that it "hit a great stride in [its] second [year] with likable but flawed characters, crisp dialogue and unpredictable twists." Kevin Baxter of the Los Angeles Times was ecstatic towards Heaton's perform in the season, and gave the finale four-out-of-four stars for being "a sweet, unpredictable and very funny flashback." In a retrospective review, IGN writer Adam Tierney called it "one of the best seasons for one of the better shows of recent TV," although also noted that it "didn't mix things up much from year one."

Awards 

For acting in the season, Madylin Sweeten won a Youth in Film award for Best Supporting Young Actress (Ten or Under) in a TV Comedy Series and a YoungStar Award for Best Young Actress in a Comedy TV Series. The season was also nominated for another Youth in Film award for Best Family TV Comedy Series, losing to Sabrina the Teenage Witch. At the 14th Viewers for Quality Television award ceremony, the season garnered six nominations, tying with Frasier's fifth season for having the second-highest number of nominations; the series also made up most of the nominations CBS garnered, as they only received two more nominations for different shows, Chicago Hope and Dr. Quinn, Medicine Woman. Doris Roberts won one of the nominations, Best Supporting Actress in a Comedy. At the 14th TCA Awards, the season was nominated for Outstanding Achievement in Comedy. The New York Times reported critics being "surprised" the season garnered zero Primetime Emmy Award nominations, a fact that CBS president Les Moonves called the ceremony's "biggest injustice."

Episodes

References 

1997 American television seasons
1998 American television seasons
Everybody Loves Raymond seasons